Manraj Singh Sarma is an Indian theater and television actor. He is best known for playing the role of Jugal in the web series Romil & Jugal.

Early life 
Manraj believes in spirituality rather than religion.

Career 
Manraj started out as a theater actor and later started working in television for Balaji Telefilms in the TV series Yeh Dil Sun Raha Hai in 2014. His role as Jugal, a young openly gay in the romantic series  Romil & Jugal (2017) received praise. Since then, he has appeared on several TV series including Qayamat Ki Raat, Kaleerein and Kehne Ko Humsafar Hain.

Television

References

External links 

 
 
 

Living people
Indian male soap opera actors
Indian_male_television_actors
Year of birth missing (living people)
Male actors in Hindi television